Civil Aviation Agency (CAA) may refer to:
 Latvian Civil Aviation Agency
 Civil Aviation Agency Slovenia

See also
 Civil Aeronautics Administration (disambiguation)
 Civil Aviation Authority